Thestral is a genus of shield bug found in central Chile. , it is monospecific, just consisting its type species T. incognitus.

The genus is named after the thestrals, a fictional horse-like creature from J.K. Rowling's Harry Potter series. The fictional animal has a skeletal body and is unable to be seen by the majority of people; Faúndez & Rider chose this name for the genus due to the bug's ivory coloring and scarcity of specimens.

See also
 List of organisms named after the Harry Potter series

References

Arthropods of Chile
Monotypic Hemiptera genera
Pentatomidae